Richard I. Cocke (August 13, 1820  – August 30, 1873) was a nineteenth-century American politician from Virginia.

Early life
Cocke was born in Powhatan County, Virginia in 1820. He graduated from the University of Virginia in 1836-37, and earned a Bachelor of Laws from the College of William and Mary in 1839.

Career

As an adult, Cocke made his home in Fluvanna County beginning in 1844, and served there for many years as Commonwealth’s Attorney.

At the age of twenty-nine, Cocke was elected to the Virginia House of Delegates 1849-50.

In 1850, Cocke was elected to the Virginia Constitutional Convention of 1850. He was one of three delegates elected from the central Piedmont delegate district made up of his home district of Fluvanna County, as well as Goochland and Louisa Counties.

During the American Civil War, Cocke served as a Captain of artillery, C.S.A.

Cocke was elected as a Virginia State Senator after the war, then afterwards he removed to Blandsville in Ballard County, Kentucky.

Death
Richard I. Cocke died in Blandsville, Kentucky on August 30, 1873.

References

Bibliography

Members of the Virginia House of Delegates
1820 births
1873 deaths
Virginia state senators
People from Powhatan County, Virginia
People from Fluvanna County, Virginia
People of Virginia in the American Civil War
University of Virginia alumni
College of William & Mary alumni
County and city Commonwealth's Attorneys in Virginia
People from Ballard County, Kentucky
19th-century American politicians
Cocke family of Virginia